Magdalen Wong (Chinese: 黃頌恩; pinyin: Huang Songen) (born 1981) is a Hong Kong / New York based artist. She typically works across the mediums of video, photography, sculpture, installation and drawing.

Life and work
Magdalen Wong was born in Hong Kong but moved to the USA at age 13 and then moved back to Hong Kong in 2006. She completed her undergraduate degree at the Maryland Institute College of Art in 2003 and a master's degree at the School of the Art Institute of Chicago in 2005.

Wong has described her practice as dealing with "mundane objects and sensual imageries" (timeoutHK). Wong takes inspiration for her work from elements in her everyday life, these include Japanese animation, toy stores, bakeries, wet markets and Sham Shui Po.

Wong is interested in altering mundane objects—through various mediums such as photography, video and sculpture—to provoke viewers to seek different narratives and the unique beauty within these everyday artifacts. Although her work can sometimes be viewed as a critique of consumer culture, she states that the intention of her work is to provoke "a mystery in the ordinary".

Notable works include the video installation mmm wow (2012) in which Wong edited together different expressions from Hong Kong television commercials, for example "mmm", "ohhh" and "wow".  The looped video works are displayed on TV sets installed with propped up the screens facing the ground. Viewers could hear the sounds from the TVs, but as the screens faced the ground, they could only see modulating colors reflected on the floor as the videos looped. In the photographic series Peeled (2010) a watermelon's green rind is peeled to reveal the pink tissue below. The photographs capture a performative gesture which transforms the mundane object of the watermelon into something strange. For Splash (2010), another photographic series, the artist collage cut-out milk splashes from cereal boxes.

Wong is part of the United States-based art group i.e. artist group. The group is made up of seven members, including Wong.They create and curate international exhibitions and events. 

Wong currently taught at the Academy of Visual Arts, Hong Kong Baptist University, from 2006 to 2011.

She shows with OV Gallery.

Awards and recognition
2014: Skowhegan School of Painting and Sculpture, Main, USA
2012: Project Exhibition Grant, Hong Kong Arts Development Council, Hong Kong
2005: Hayward Prize, The American Austrian Foundation, Salzburg Summer Academy, Salzburg, Austria

Selected solo exhibitions
 2011: Sunrise Sunset, Corner Gallery,  Seoul, South Korea
 2011: Shift, Goethe Institute, Hong Kong
 2013: A Flight of Fancy, Osage Open Gallery, Hong Kong

Selected group exhibitions
 2006: Asian Traffic: line-feed, Hong Kong Visual Art Centre, Hong Kong
 2007: 97+10: Hand Baggage, Videotage, MOCA, Shanghai
 2008: What are you doing where?, Para/site Art Space at Hong Kong-Shenzhen Biennale of Urbanism/Architecture, Hong Kong
 2008: Domestic Affairs, Galleri 21, Malmo, Sweden
 2009: cheapart gallery, Art-Athina: International Contemporary Art Fair of Athens, Greece
 2010: Double Happiness: A Story of Siamese Cities, Studio Double Happiness and OV Gallery, Hong Kong
 2011: i can't go on, i must go on, Tempus Projects, Tampa, FL, USA
2011: Closer & Closing, The National Art Studio, Goyang, Seoul, South Korea
 2012: NO LONGER HUMAN, Osage Kwun Tong, Hong Kong
 2012: Why Do Trees Grow Till the End?, Southsite, Gallery Exit, Hong Kong
 2012: hi • a • tus, Urban Institute of Contemporary Arts, Grand Rapids, MI, USA
2012: Traits, Ox Warehouse, Macau
 2013: Follies of Species, OV Gallery, Shanghai, China
 2013: Fresh 10, Outlet Gallery, Brooklyn, NY
 2014: The Heroic Object, Parallel Art Space, Brooklyn, NY
 2014: The Part in the Story Where a Part Becomes a Part of Something Else, Witte de With, Rotterdam, The Netherlands
 2015: DAYS PUSH OFF INTO NIGHT, Spring Workshop, Hong Kong

References

External links
Artist website: http://www.magdalenwong.com

Hong Kong women artists
Hong Kong artists
1981 births
Living people
Maryland Institute College of Art alumni
School of the Art Institute of Chicago alumni
Skowhegan School of Painting and Sculpture alumni